Gramy Records is a Hungarian record label specializing in jazz, world music and classical music.

The company was founded in 1999 by Attila Egerházi. It is part of the Gramy Group, which includes a recording studio, film studio, an office for graphic design and web design, and an advertising agency.

Roster
Johanna Beisteiner
Budapest Symphony Orchestra
Ben Castle 
Djabe
Béla Drahos
Steve Hackett 
Chester Thompson

References

External links 
Official site  (English and Hungarian)
Gramy Group (English and Hungarian)

Classical music record labels
Hungarian independent record labels
Jazz record labels
Record labels established in 1999
World music record labels
1999 establishments in Hungary